Nuselský SK was a Czechoslovak football club from the town of Nusle – later incorporated into the city of Prague. The club played in the first three seasons of the Czechoslovak First League. In 2003 the club merged with AFK Podolí and ceased to exist in its own right. It is one of two clubs from the area to have played in the nation's top division of football, the other being SK Nusle.

Historical names 
1909 NSK
1912 Nuselský SK
1948 Sokol (Masna) Nuselský
1953 Slavoj Praha (PPM)

References

Football clubs in Czechoslovakia
Czechoslovak First League clubs
Football clubs in Prague
Association football clubs established in 1909
Association football clubs disestablished in 2003
Defunct football clubs in the Czech Republic